Area 25 can refer to:

 Brodmann area 25, an area of the brain's cerebral cortex
 Area 25 (Nevada National Security Site)